was a Japanese baseball shortstop, second baseman and coach. Makino played with the Nagoya/Chunichi Dragons from 1952 to 1959. He later coached the Yomiuri Giants from 1961 to 1974, and again from 1981 to 1983. He was elected to the Japanese Baseball Hall of Fame in 1991.

External links
Baseball-Reference

Japanese baseball players
Chunichi Dragons players
1928 births
1984 deaths
People from Takamatsu, Kagawa